Graham Spring (born 20 April 1961) is an Australian cricketer. He played one first-class and four List A matches for New South Wales between 1982/83 and 1983/84.

See also
 List of New South Wales representative cricketers

References

External links
 

1961 births
Living people
Australian cricketers
New South Wales cricketers
Cricketers from Sydney